Acleris scabrana, the gray rough-wing moth, is a species of moth of the family Tortricidae. It is found in Europe, where it has been recorded from France, Belgium, the Netherlands, Germany, Austria, Switzerland, the Czech Republic, Slovakia, Poland, Hungary, Romania, Finland, Latvia, Lithuania, Ukraine and Russia. It is also found in Kazakhstan, Tian Shan, Yakutia, Asia Minor and North America, where it has been recorded from Alberta and British Columbia to California.

The wingspan is 18–24 mm. Adults are on wing from October to April.

The larvae feed on Salix and Populus species. Larvae can be found in August.

References

Moths described in 1775
scabrana
Moths of Europe
Moths of Asia
Moths of North America